An independence referendum was held in the Faroe Islands, an autonomous territory of Denmark, on 14 September 1946. Although a narrow majority of valid votes were cast in favour of the proposal (50.7%), the number of invalid votes exceeded the winning margin. Although independence was declared by the Speaker of the Løgting on 18 September 1946, the declaration was not recognised by Denmark. Danish King Christian X dissolved the Løgting and called fresh elections, which were won by unionist parties. The islands were subsequently given a greater level of self-rule.

Results

By island

Aftermath
The result – without taking the invalid votes into regard – was 50.7% in favour of full independence to 49.3% in favour of home rule within Denmark.

However, there were 4.1% invalid votes, mostly voters who rejected both proposals. Some politicians from the People's Party had suggested that a third option of a sovereign Faroe Islands within a union with Denmark should be on the ballot (similar to the status the Kingdom of Iceland had 1918–44), but since this proposal was not put on the ballot, they suggested that voters write 'no' to the first proposal оn the ballot instead of choosing either alternative, while some Social Democrats in favour of keeping the status quo recommended writing 'no' to the second proposal.

Subsequently, there was disunion about the interpretation of the result, as there was no full majority for either proposal; only a slight plurality for option 2, the full independence.

The chairman of the Løgting subsequently declared independence on 18 September 1946, but this was not recognised either by a majority of the Løgting or the Danish parliament and government. King Christian X of Denmark dissolved the Løgting on 24 September and called for new elections. The dissolution of the Løgting was on 8 November followed by the Faroese parliamentary election of 1946 in which the parties in favour of full independence received a total of 5,396 votes while the parties against received a total of 7,488 votes. New negotiations followed, and Denmark granted the Faroe Islands home-rule on 30 March 1948.

See also

Faroese independence movement
Faroese language conflict

References

Faroe Islands
Referendums in the Faroe Islands
Faroe Islands
Independence
Faroe Islands
Separatism in Denmark
Faroese nationalism
Faroe Islands